Spirit of the West may refer to:
 Spirit of the West, a Canadian alternative rock band
 Spirit of the West (album), their debut album
 Spirit of the West (film), a 1932 American western
 Spirit of the West (train), a former Australian restaurant train